I Capture the Castle is the first novel of English author Dodie Smith, written during the Second World War when she and her husband Alec Beesley, an English conscientious objector, moved to California. She longed for home and wrote of a happier time, unspecified in the novel apart from a reference to living in the 1930s. Smith was already an established playwright and later became famous for writing the children's classic The Hundred and One Dalmatians.

The novel relates the adventures of an eccentric family, the Mortmains, struggling to live in genteel poverty in a decaying castle during the 1930s. The first-person narrator is Cassandra Mortmain, an intelligent teenager who tells the story through her journal. It is a coming-of-age story in which Cassandra passes from being a girl at the beginning to being a young woman at the end.

In 2003 the novel was listed at number 82 in the BBC's survey The Big Read.

Plot 
The novel takes place between April and October in a single year in the 1930s. The Mortmain family is genteel, poor, and eccentric. Cassandra's father is a writer suffering from writer's block who has not published anything since his first book, Jacob Wrestling (a reference to Jacob wrestling with the angel), an innovative and "difficult" modernist novel that sold well and made his name, including in the United States. Ten years before the novel begins he took out a forty-year lease on a dilapidated but beautiful castle, hoping to find either inspiration or isolation there. Now his family is selling off the furniture to buy food.

The widowed Mortmain's second wife, Topaz, is a beautiful artist's model who enjoys communing with nature, sometimes wearing nothing but hip boots. Rose, Mortmain's elder daughter, is a classic English beauty pining away in the lonely castle, longing for a chance to meet eligible and preferably rich young men. She tells her sister Cassandra that she wants to live in a Jane Austen novel. Cassandra, the younger daughter and the first-person narrator of the novel, has literary ambitions and spends a lot of time developing her writing talent by "capturing" everything around her in her journal. Stephen, the handsome, loyal, live-in son of the Mortmain late maid, and Thomas, the youngest Mortmain child, round out the cast of household characters. Stephen, a "noble soul," is in love with Cassandra, which she finds touching but a bit awkward. Thomas, a schoolboy, is, like Cassandra, considered "tolerably bright".

Things begin to happen when the Cottons, a wealthy American family, inherit nearby Scoatney Hall and become the Mortmains' new landlords. Cassandra and Rose soon become intrigued by the unmarried brothers Simon and Neil Cotton. Neil, who was raised in California by their English father, is a carefree young man who wants to become a rancher in the United States. Simon, who grew up in New England with his mother, is scholarly and serious, and loves the English countryside. Simon is the elder brother and therefore the heir, and is already much wealthier than Neil, so, although Rose is not attracted to him, she decides to marry him if she can, declaring that she would marry the Devil himself to escape poverty.

At their first meeting the Cottons are amused and interested by the Mortmains. When they pay a call the very next day, however, the inexperienced Rose flirts openly with Simon and makes herself look ridiculous. Both brothers are repelled by this display and, as they walk away, Cassandra overhears them resolving to drop all acquaintance with the Mortmains. After an amusing episode involving a fur coat, however, all is forgiven and the two families become good friends. Rose decides that she really is taken with Simon, and Cassandra and Topaz scheme to get Simon to propose to her. Simon falls in love with Rose and proposes to her.

Rose and Topaz go to London with Mrs Cotton to purchase Rose's wedding trousseau. While everyone else is away Cassandra and Simon spend the evening together, which leads to their kissing. Cassandra  becomes obsessed with Simon, but suffers feelings of guilt since he is Rose's fiancé. Cassandra concludes that she must tactfully deflect Stephen's offer of love, and encourage him in his emerging career as a model and a film actor. She joins forces with Thomas to help their father overcome his writer's block by the drastic expedient of imprisoning him in a medieval tower; copes with her own increasing attraction to Simon; and records everything in her journal.

Meanwhile, unnoticed by everyone but Stephen, Rose and Neil have been falling in love. To conceal their budding romance they pretend to hate each other. When they eventually elope Simon is left heartbroken, but Cassandra becomes hopeful. Before Simon leaves to go back to the United States, he comes to see Cassandra.  In spite of her feelings for him, Cassandra deflects the conversation at a moment when she thinks he might be about to propose to her, in the belief that he is still in love with Rose. The book closes on an ambiguous note, with Cassandra reminding herself that Simon has promised to return and closing her journal for good by reasserting her love for him.

References and allusions

Prose works
Novels mentioned in I Capture the Castle include À la recherche du temps perdu by Proust and War and Peace by Leo Tolstoy. At one point in the book Rose and Cassandra begin, but do not finish, a bedtime conversation about whether Jane Austen or Charlotte Brontë is "better". The Vicar describes Cassandra as "Jane Eyre with a touch of Becky Sharp", the latter being the leading character in Vanity Fair. Edgar Allan Poe's short story "The Fall of the House of Usher" is also mentioned. Cassandra mentions having read What Maisie Knew, thinking it to be a children's book. Villette, also by Charlotte Brontë, is referenced when Cassandra considers "confessing" to the Vicar as a means of soothing her mind.

Theatre
Cassandra compares Stephen to Silvius, a character in Shakespeare's As You Like It.

Simon compares Cassandra to Portia, a character in Shakespeare's The Merchant of Venice when he quotes the line, "Oh, wise, young judge."

Biblical episodes
Biblical episodes, mainly Jacob's Ladder and Jacob Wrestling, are apparently referred to in Mr Mortmain's successful novel Jacob Wrestling, though the content of that novel is never clearly represented to the reader. Cassandra calls it "a mixture of fiction, philosophy and poetry". Samson and Delilah also play a small part in I Capture the Castle, as Cassandra compares Simon and Rose to them.

When he starts to try to write a new book Mr Mortmain considers the theme of Noah's Ark, but finally decides not to use a biblical theme again.

Tales and legends
"Héloïse" and "Abelard" are respectively the names of the family's dog and cat. Also cited are the "Sleeping Beauty" and "Hansel and Gretel".

Verse
Stephen plagiarises from numerous poets in an attempt to impress Cassandra, including Algernon Charles Swinburne, then tries to imitate Robert Herrick in his first attempts at original verse. John Keats, G. K. Chesterton, Thomas Nashe and Percy Bysshe Shelley are also quoted.

Cassandra also mentions Chaucer and William Langland, and the round "Sumer is icumen in" when, during an impromptu luncheon in the village with Simon, Neil and Rose, school children begin singing it.

Art
At a dinner party guests describe each other in terms of famous artists. Topaz is called a work by William Blake, Rose is said to resemble Emma, Lady Hamilton, the muse of the painter George Romney, Simon says that Cassandra is like "Girl with a Mousetrap," a painting by Joshua Reynolds, and Mrs Fox-Cotton is said to be a work by Salvador Dalí "with snakes coming out of her ears".

Music
Simon introduces Cassandra to the works of Claude Debussy: "Clair de lune", "La cathédrale engloutie", "La terrasse des audiences du clair de lune".

She also listens to J. S. Bach's "Sheep May Safely Graze" which she later searches for amongst the Vicar's collection of records.

Simon and Cassandra dance to the song "Lover" before he kisses her. The song then takes on a special significance for her, and she hears it again when Neil and Rose are dancing together in London.

Adaptations
Smith adapted her novel into a two-act play "with musical notes" in 1954.
In 1963 Walt Disney Productions announced plans to film the novel with Hayley Mills in the role of Cassandra. Disney ended up dropping the project, while still retaining film rights to the book, when Smith and the selected screenwriter Sally Benson did not get along. Mills grew too old for the part before the project could be revived, but Disney denied film rights to any other studio until intense legal leveraging in the late 1990s after Smith's death, which eventually resulted in the 2003 BBC Film production.
After Disney released the film rights to the novel in the late 1990s, Heidi Thomas wrote a screen adaptation. This resulted in a 2003 feature film directed by Tim Fywell for BBC Films. It starred Romola Garai as Cassandra.
In November 2015, a BBC Radio 4 adaption was broadcast, which was dramatised by Jane Rogers and directed by Nadia Molinari. It starred Holliday Grainger as Cassandra and Toby Jones as Mortmain.
A musical adaptation with book and lyrics by Teresa Howard and music by Steven Edis received its staged premiere at the Watford Palace Theatre in April 2017. It was directed by Brigid Larmour.
A musical adaptation with lyrics by Marion Adler, score by Peter Foley, and book by Cara Reichel was commissioned by Signature Theatre's American Musical Voices Project: Next Generation (Arlington, Virginia) and given staged readings in 2013 at Pace New Musicals (Pace University, New York, New York).

Critical reception
On 5 November 2019, the BBC News listed I Capture the Castle on its list of the 100 most influential novels.

I Capture The Castle was cited by Armistead Maupin as an influence on his novel Maybe the Moon, which he also structured as a diary.

References

External links
A reading group guide for I Capture the Castle.

1948 British novels
Novels by Dodie Smith
British romance novels
British comedy novels
British novels adapted into films
1948 debut novels
British novels adapted into plays
British bildungsromans
Heinemann (publisher) books